is a 1995 2D platform video game by Hudson Soft for Super Famicom. It is the sequel to Super Bonk and the fifth game in the Bonk series, and the second platform game in the series never to be released outside Japan.

External links 
 Super Bonk 2 at The Bonk Compendium (covering all games and references to Bonk series)
 Super Bonk / Super Genjin at Hardcore Gaming 101

Notes

Japan-exclusive video games
Super Nintendo Entertainment System games
Super Nintendo Entertainment System-only games
Platform games
1995 video games
Bonk (series)
Prehistoric life in popular culture
Video games developed in Japan

Single-player video games
Video game sequels